The Spanish Virgin Islands,  formerly called the Passage Islands (Spanish: Islas del Pasaje) and also known as the Puerto Rican Virgin Islands (Islas Vírgenes Puertorriqueñas), West Virgin Islands (Spanish: Islas Vírgenes Occidental, Islas Vírgenes Occidentales) primarily consisting of the islands of Culebra and Vieques, are part of the Commonwealth of Puerto Rico and are located east of the main island of Puerto Rico in the Caribbean.

Despite its name, the islands are no longer under Spanish sovereignty.

History

Archaeological works in Vieques indicate that the island of Vieques was inhabited by indigenous groups from South America around 1,500 years before the arrival of Christopher Columbus in 1493. The inhabitants of Vieques, brothers of the Taínos of the Big Island of Puerto Rico, resisted the Spaniards' plans of colonization and slavery.

It has been documented that Christopher Columbus discovered the island of Culebra on his second trip to America in 1493. It is believed that the first known inhabitants of the island were the Taíno Indians and then the Caribs. Culebra Island served as a refuge for many defeated Taíno Indians during the rebellion against the Spanish in 1511.

English from Vieques's neighboring British colonies—Tortola, Anguilla, Saint Kitts and Nevis—established themselves in Vieques on several occasions throughout the 17th and 18th centuries. In 1688, and later in 1717, these English tried to colonize Vieques, establishing hamlets, a military fort, an English government, and extensive farming. In both cases the Spanish governor in Puerto Rico sent strong military expeditions and successfully evicted the English "invaders" and thus assured Spanish domination over Vieques.

In 1875, the Spanish Crown made an effort to populate the island of Culebra. But it was not until 1880 that the colonization of Culebra began with the founding of the town of San Idelfonso de la Culebra.

Like Puerto Rico, the islands belonged to Spain until 1898. On September 19, 1898, the United States took possession of the islands after the signing of the armistice that ended military operations in the Spanish–American War. The islands, along with the islands of Puerto Rico, Mona, Monito, Desecheo, and other smaller islands adjacent to the island of Puerto Rico, were formally ceded by Spain to the United States with the signing of the Treaty of Paris on December 10, 1898.

In 1903 the U.S. government reserved all public lands belonging to the Spanish Crown on the island of Culebra for the use of the U.S. Navy. At that time the U.S. military took complete control of the community of San Ildefonso de la Culebra, expelling its residents, and
huddled in a small area of Bahía Sardinas, which they called Dewey in honor of an outstanding American admiral during the Spanish-American War.

On March 17, 1941, Public Law 13 was passed in Washington, allocating $35 million for the construction of the Vieques Base. On August 25 of the same year, Public Law 247 allowed the U.S. Navy to take immediate possession of the lands to be expropriated in Vieques.

With the outbreak of World War II, Culebra Island became the main artillery- and bombing-practice area for the U.S. Navy and continued to be used for this purpose until 1975.

Geography

Puerto Rican tourist literature uses the name Spanish Virgin Islands, but most general maps and atlases do not treat these islands as part of the Virgin Islands archipelago. They are mostly referred to as Islas Municipio, with Vieques being called Isla Nena. As part of Puerto Rico, the Spanish Virgin Islands have been controlled by the United States since the Spanish–American War in 1898 and up until then belonged to Spain. Spanish remains the predominant language, although English is also common.

The principal islands of the group are Culebra and Vieques, with multiple associated smaller islands and islets. Other islands that are close to the shore of Puerto Rico include Icacos Island, Cayo Lobo, Cayo Diablo, Palomino Island, Palominito Island, Isla de Ramos, and Isla Pineiro. Near Culebra is Cayo Luis Peña.

Culebra's smaller island, Culebrita, is part of the Culebra National Wildlife Refuge. Much of Vieques is part of the Vieques National Wildlife Refuge, formerly a U.S. Navy facility. Culebra is characterized by an irregular topography resulting in an intricate coastline. The coast is marked by cliffs, coral sand beaches, and mangroves. Its hydrography is based on lagoons (Laguna Flamenco, Laguna Zoní, Laguna de Cornelio, and Laguna de Molino, among others), bays (Ensenada Honda [including Ensenada del Coronel, Ensenada Fulladoza, Ensenada del Cementerio, Ensenada Dákity, Bahía Mosquito, and Ensenada Malena], Puerto Manglar, and Bahía de Tamarindo, among others), and small creeks.

See also

Dependent territory
Insular area of the United States

References

External links
 Official website of the Government of Puerto Rico 

Culebra, Puerto Rico
Vieques, Puerto Rico
Islands of Puerto Rico
Spanish Virgin Islands
Virgin Islands
Archipelagoes of the United States